The Papua New Guinea national badminton team represents Papua New Guinea in international badminton team competitions. It is organized by Badminton Papua New Guinea, the governing body for badminton in Papua New Guinea. Badminton is not a popular sport in Papua New Guinea, The national team have rarely participated in international team events.

While the sport is not popular in the nation, it has been gaining slight popularity with the help of Shuttle Time programs organized by the Badminton World Federation to support the teaching of enjoyable, safe and inclusive badminton activities to children.

Papua New Guinea also competes in para-badminton. The para-badminton team competed in the 2020 Oceania Para-Badminton Championships and won a silver and a bronze medal.

Participation in Oceania Para-Badminton Championships 
Papua New Guinea debuted in the 2020 Oceania Para-Badminton Championships. David Joe Kaniku won Papua New Guinea's first medal at the championships.

List of medalists

Current squad

Para-badminton 

Men
Jerome Bunge
David Joe Kaniku
Danny Ten

Women
Dorna Longbut
Nelly Ruth Leva

References 

Badminton
National badminton teams